Fort Landing is an unincorporated community in Tyrrell County, North Carolina, United States. From 1932 to 1951, Fort Landing was the eastern terminus of US 64.

References

Unincorporated communities in Tyrrell County, North Carolina
Unincorporated communities in North Carolina